Otis Taylor (August 11, 1942 – March 9, 2023) was an American professional football player who was a wide receiver. He played college football at Prairie View A&M University. He was drafted by the American Football League's Kansas City Chiefs in the fourth round (29th overall) of the 1965 AFL Draft. He was also selected in the 15th round of the 1965 NFL Draft by the Philadelphia Eagles. He chose to play in the AFL for the Chiefs where he would spend his entire career.

Professional career
Taylor was selected in the 1965 AFL draft (Chiefs) and the NFL draft, by the Philadelphia Eagles.  After a famous "baby-sitting" incident, in which Taylor "escaped" from NFL scouts, he was signed for the Chiefs by their legendary scout Lloyd Wells.

Taylor caught five touchdown passes during his rookie year, and followed that up in 1966 by leading the AFL with a 22.4 yd/catch average and finishing second in receiving yards (1,297).  At season's end, he was voted First-team All-AFL and was selected for the 1966 AFL All-Star team.  Taylor led the AFL in receiving touchdowns in 1967 with 11 and led the NFL in receiving yards in 1971 with 1,110. He made the AFC-NFC Pro Bowl twice and in 1971 was named Consensus All-Pro by the Associated Press (AP), the Newspaper Enterprise Association (NEA), the Pro Football Writers Association (PFWA) and Pro Football Weekly. The PFWA also named him First-team All-Pro for the 1972 season. Taylor ranks in the Chiefs' all-time list in receptions (6th, 410), receiving yards (3rd, 7,306), receiving touchdowns (3rd, 57), and 100-yard games (20).

Taylor combined with running back Robert Holmes for what was at the time the longest reception in Chiefs history in 1969 when he caught a pass from quarterback Mike Livingston for 79 yards, then lateraled to Holmes, who carried it another 14 yards for a touchdown. However, Taylor's most memorable highlight from that season came in the fourth and final AFL-NFL World Championship Game on January 11, 1970. After the Vikings made it a 16–7 game, Taylor caught a quick pass from Len Dawson, escaped a tackle attempt by Earsell Mackbee and ran down the sidelines for a 46-yard touchdown to close out the scoring with 82 seconds remaining in the third quarter. The Chiefs won a 23–7 upset over the NFL champion  Minnesota Vikings which, prior to Super Bowl IV, had been dubbed by some as "the greatest team in pro football history".

"Otis made my job easy," Chiefs quarterback and Hall of Famer Len Dawson said. "If you got the pass to Otis, you knew he'd catch it."

The Professional Football Researchers Association named Taylor to the PFRA Hall of Very Good Class of 2006.

Ben Davidson incident
On November 1, 1970, the Chiefs led the Oakland Raiders 17–14 late in the fourth quarter, and a long run for a first-down run by Dawson apparently sealed victory for the Chiefs in the final minute when Dawson, as he lay on the ground, was speared by Raiders' defensive end Ben Davidson, who dove into Dawson with his helmet, provoking Taylor to attack Davidson.

After a bench-clearing brawl, offsetting penalties were called, nullifying the first down under the rules in effect at that time. The Chiefs were obliged to punt, and the Raiders tied the game on a George Blanda field goal with eight seconds to play. Davidson's hit against Dawson not only cost the Chiefs a win, but helped Oakland win the AFC West  with a season record of 8–4–2, while defending world champion Kansas City finished 7–5–2 and out of the playoffs. The very next season, the rule for offsetting personal foul penalties was changed to separate penalties during the play, and penalties after the play. The rule change was largely due to this play.

Jack Del Rio incident
After his time as a player had come to a close, Taylor became a scout for the Kansas City Chiefs. During the 1987 NFL Player's strike, Taylor was arriving at Arrowhead Stadium and was assaulted by Jack Del Rio, who was a new player to the organization in 1987 and was striking with his teammates. Del Rio mistook Taylor for a replacement player and was told Taylor was actually a Chiefs legend and retired player by fans who had come upon the assault. He later pressed charges against Del Rio and the two settled out of court.

Personal life
Taylor and his wife, Regina, had a son.

Health and death
In 1969, Taylor began experiencing seizures. In 1990, he was diagnosed with Parkinson's disease dementia, which eroded his health over the following decades, until he was bedbound and largely incommunicative in his last years. His family filed a lawsuit against the NFL in 2012, believing that his medical conditions were caused by injuries he received during his playing career. He died on March 9, 2023, at the age of 80.

See also

Chiefs–Raiders rivalry
American Football League players, coaches, and contributors

References

External links
 

1942 births
2023 deaths
Players of American football from Houston
American football wide receivers
Prairie View A&M Panthers football players
American Conference Pro Bowl players
Kansas City Chiefs players
American Football League players
American Football League All-Star players
Violence in sports
Deaths from Parkinson's disease
Deaths from dementia